Hamom Sadananda is an Indian actor and singer who predominantly appears in Manipuri films. He is a resident of Sega Road, Thouda Bhabok Leikai, Imphal, Manipur. He has acted in more than 100 Manipuri films. Besides acting and singing in films, he also performs Manipuri Sankirtana on various Manipur occasions.

Ingengi Atiya, Chumthang Makhong, Sakthibee Tampha, Natephamda Tero, Manithoiba are some of his famous movies.

Career
Hamom Sadananda acted as a child artist in the 1993 film Sambal Wangma. He started his career initially in singing and then later became a successful actor in Manipuri film industry. His first film is Ingengi Atiya (The Sky of Autumn). He has now done more than 100 films. Among his popular films are Ingengi Atiya, Manithoiba, Chumthang Makhong, Imagi Laman Singamdre, Khuji, Thoiba Thoibi and Mami Sami. He has also produced a music video titled Engao Ngaojabi which stars Bonium Thokchom and Eshita Yengkhom.

In Chumthang Makhong and Ekhenglaktagi Red Rose, he played the role of militants. He played a cancer patient in the film Da Sadananda. In films like Eidee Lankhide and Khongthang-gi Makhol, he played antagonistic roles.

His role of Achouba, a brain tumor patient who sacrifices everything for his mother and his brothers in the film Hingbagee Mahao, earned him a Best Actor in a Leading Role - Male award at the 5th SSS MANIFA 2016.

Accolades
He has won a number of awards. He won the Best Male Playback Singer award for Houda Houjillu song from the film Nobap at the 7th Manipur State Film Festival 2010, For the film Tabunungda Akaiba Likli, he won the Best Actor in a Supporting Role and Best Male Playback Singer awards at the 3rd SSS MANIFA 2014. He received the Special Jury Mention at the 8th Manipur State Film Awards 2013 for his role in the movie Imagi Laman Singamdre. He also bagged the Best Actor Award at the 5th SSS MANIFA 2016 for the film Hingbagee Mahao.

He was also honoured with the title Brother of the Disabled by the authority of the Disabled Development Association, Manipur (DDAM) in February 2015.

Off-screen work
Hamom Sadananda was the brand ambassador of Kaizen Sports along with Soma Laishram and Oinam Bembem Devi.

Selected filmography

References

External links
 Hamom Sadananda

Living people
21st-century Indian male actors
Indian male film actors
Male actors from Manipur
Meitei people
People from Imphal
Year of birth missing (living people)
Shumang Kumhei artists